Law of "confrontation with human-rights violations, and USA adventuresome and terrorist measures in the region" is a comprehension plan; including 9 sections, in 27 articles. It has been ratified in the National-Security and Foreign-Policy Commission of the Islamic Consultative Assembly of Iran.

The mentioned plan/law which was approved on 13 August 2017, is presented in nine sections, consisting: generalities, definitions, strategy, US support for terrorism, US human rights abuses, punishments and mutual actions, countering US economic sanctions, supporting Iranian citizens, and coordination.

See also 
 Islamic Consultative Assembly
 Judicial system of Iran
 Legislature of Iran
 Ministry of Foreign Affairs (Iran)
 The Act to confronting the hostile actions of the Zionist regime against peace and security
 Protection of the Islamic Revolution of the Palestinian People Act
 The Act to Obliging the Government to Provide Comprehensive Support to the Oppressed Palestinian People

References 

Law of Iran
Government of Iran
Modern history of Iran